Żakowice  is a village in the administrative district of Gmina Susz, within Iława County, Warmian-Masurian Voivodeship, in northern Poland.

The village has a population of 770.

References

Villages in Iława County